Tiago Filipe Oliveira Dantas (born 24 December 2000) is a Portuguese professional footballer who plays as a midfielder for Super League Greece club PAOK, on loan from Benfica.

Club career

Dantas was born on 24 December 2000 in Lisbon, Portugal. In August 2018, he made his professional debut with the second team of Benfica, while 1.5 years later he reached the first team in a match against Vitória de Setúbal for the Portuguese Cup.

In October 2020 he moved on loan to Bayern Munich. Bayern, however, decided not to pay the buyout and the player returned to Benfica. Dantas was then loaned to Tondela for the 2021-22 Primeira Liga.

In June 2022, PAOK announced the acquisition of Tiago Dantas in the form of a loan from Benfica until the summer of 2023.

Club statistics

Honours
Benfica
 Campeonato Nacional de Juniores: 2017–18
 UEFA Youth League runner-up: 2019–20

Bayern Munich
 Bundesliga: 2020–21
 FIFA Club World Cup: 2020

References

External links
 

2000 births
Living people
Footballers from Lisbon
Portuguese footballers
Association football midfielders
S.L. Benfica footballers
Primeira Liga players
S.L. Benfica B players
Liga Portugal 2 players
Portugal youth international footballers
Portugal under-21 international footballers
FC Bayern Munich footballers
FC Bayern Munich II players
Bundesliga players
3. Liga players
Super League Greece players
C.D. Tondela players
PAOK FC players
Portuguese expatriate footballers
Portuguese expatriate sportspeople in Germany
Expatriate footballers in Germany
Portuguese expatriate sportspeople in Greece
Expatriate footballers in Greece